Kuromorigawa No.1 Dam is an earthfill dam located in Akita Prefecture in Japan. The dam is used for water supply. The catchment area of the dam is 5.7 km2. The dam impounds about 18  ha of land when full and can store 1305 thousand cubic meters of water. The construction of the dam was started on 1974 and completed in 1976.

References

Dams in Akita Prefecture
1976 establishments in Japan